David More Anderson (2 February 1865 – 11 February 1936) was an Australian politician.

He was born at Glasgow, Scotland, to master painter Archibald Anderson and Elizabeth Buchanan, née More. He arrived in Australia in 1884, finding work as a grocer, agent and auctioneer in the Leichhardt area of Sydney. Around 1891 he married Emily Amelia Ely Linderman, with whom he had two children; he would later marry Florence May McWhirter and have a further six children. In 1896 he moved to Gladesville and in 1905 to Ryde, serving as an alderman on Ryde Municipal Council from 1896 to 1919 (mayor 1904, 1908, 1913). He continued to work in the real estate and auctioneering business, and also established a brickworks in 1910. In 1920 he was elected to the New South Wales Legislative Assembly as a Nationalist member for Ryde. With the reintroduction of single-member districts in 1927 he was elected as the member for Eastwood, but he was defeated in 1930. Anderson died at Ryde in 1936.

References

 

1865 births
1936 deaths
Nationalist Party of Australia members of the Parliament of New South Wales
Members of the New South Wales Legislative Assembly
Mayors of Ryde
New South Wales local councillors
Politicians from Glasgow
Scottish emigrants to colonial Australia
Australian auctioneers